The Phyllodini are a tribe of moths in the family Erebidae.

Taxonomy
The Phyllodini are thought to be one of the two clades comprising the Calpinae, with the other clade containing the tribes Calpini and Ophiderini.

Genera
The following genera are included in the tribe.
Miniodes
Phyllodes

References

Calpinae
Moth tribes